Roszki-Chrzczony  is a village in the administrative district of Gmina Sokoły, within Wysokie Mazowieckie County, Podlaskie Voivodeship, in north-eastern Poland.

References

Roszki-Chrzczony